Milieu therapy is a form of psychotherapy that involves the use of therapeutic communities. Patients join a group of around 30, for between 9 and 18 months. During their stay, patients are encouraged to take responsibility for themselves and the others within the unit, based upon a hierarchy of collective consequences. Patients are expected to hold one another to following rules, with more senior patients expected to model appropriate behavior for newer patients. If one patient violates the rules, others who were aware of the violation but did not intervene may also be punished to varying extents based upon their involvement. Milieu therapy is thought to be of value in treating personality disorders and behavioural problems, and can also be used with a goal of stimulating the patient's remaining cognitive-communicative abilities. Organizations known to use milieu therapy include Cassel Hospital, in London, Forest Heights Lodge in Evergreen, CO, the United States Veteran's Administration, and the Kansas Industrial School for Girls in Beloit, Kansas.

References

Varcarolis, E.M. (1990). Foundations of Psychiatric Mental Health Nursing. New York: W.B. Saunders Company, p. 30.

External links
Henderson Hospital Trust

Psychotherapies
Therapeutic community